The Kakadu Highway is 209 kilometres long and extends from Pine Creek to Jabiru, entering Kakadu National Park as the highway crosses the Mary River.
The highway is signed and mapped as State Route 21.

See also

 Highways in Australia
 List of highways in the Northern Territory

References

Highways in the Northern Territory